The Men's 100 metre breaststroke SB8 event at the 2018 Commonwealth Games was held on 7 April at the Gold Coast Aquatic Centre.

Schedule
The schedule is as follows:

All times are Australian Eastern Standard Time (UTC+10)

Results

Heats

Final

References

Men's 100 metre breaststroke SB8